2BL may refer to:
2BL, call sign for Australian radio station ABC Radio Sydney
Block 2BL, a Russian rocket stage